Medea (2007) is the debut EP by Michou. It was recorded in two days by founding members Michael Hargreaves, Ryan Ard, Ryan Frith, Lucas Semple and Sasha Appler in the home of friend Joel Bruyere and released on November 24, 2007.

The title of this album is an example of Michou's strong use of literary figures in order to complement the story telling of their music, just as their debut full length is named after the protagonist, Prince Lev Nikolaevich Myshkin, in the novel The Idiot by Fyodor Dostoevsky. The song "The Queen's Line" touches on elements of Kierkegaardian philosophy with the opening line "This is my infinite resignation".

Track listing 
 "None The Less"
 "Careless"
 "The Queen's Line"
 "St. Mary's Park"
 "Untimely Event"

References 

2007 debut EPs
Michou albums